is a Japanese police procedural television drama. The first season, subtitled , was set in a fictional version of the Tokyo Metropolitan Police Department division that specializes in investigating cold cases, which is based on an actual division established in Japan in 2009. The first season aired from April 13 to June 22, 2010 on Fuji TV's Kakku time-slot. It premiered to an 18% rating. A special two-hour-long episode which served as conclusion to the first series was aired on July 8, 2011.

Season two of Zettai Reido, subtitled  takes place a year after the events of the special episode, after Sakuragi and her fellow detectives have been transferred to the undercover investigation division which deals with current crimes. The second season aired from July 12 to September 20, 2011 on Fuji TV's Kakku time-slot. It premiered to a 15.4% rating and ended with a season-high rating of 16.3%. The last leg of the second season featured guest star appearances by Yūsuke Santamaria and You Yokoyama.

The opening and ending themes for season one and two are performed by rock duo Love Psychedelico.

Series synopsis
Izumi Sakuragi (Aya Ueto) is an energetic rookie detective assigned to the Tokyo Metropolitan Police Department's special investigations office. This newly established division uses DNA analysis and the latest in forensics science to investigate unresolved cases and cases suspected to involve missing persons.

Cast and characters
 Aya Ueto as Izumi Sakuragi, a rookie detective with the special investigations office. Due to her inexperience, she is nicknamed .
 Hiroyuki Miyasako as Keigo Tsukamoto, a police sergeant who is often partnered with Sakuragi.
 Sayaka Yamaguchi as Ryōko Takamine, the special investigations office's resident criminal profiler.
 Tomomi Maruyama as Yūki Fukazawa, a police inspector with the special investigations office. In season two, he is promoted to the position of Chief Investigator of the eighth section.
 Hiromi Kitagawa as Sae Ōmori, the crime lab chief and main technician.
 Ryo Kimura as Shō Takebayashi, the crime lab technician in charge of computer forensics.
 Takeo Nakahara as Shintarō Shiraishi, a detective with the special investigations office.
 Tetta Sugimoto as Takumi Kurata, a senior detective with the special investigations office.
 Kin'ya Kitaōji as Hideo Nagashima, the Director General of the special investigations office.
 Akira Nagata as Yukinari Michio
 Keisuke Minami as Tōru Akiyama
 Megumi Saito as Tomomi Mitsui
 Kenta Kiritani as Shinjirō Takigawa, a detective with the special undercover crime investigations office and Sakuragi's partner.
 Takashika Kobayashi as Ryōhei Isomura, a detective with the special undercover crime investigations office.
 Rie Minemura as Megumi Inohara

Episodes and ratings

First season

Second season

Awards

See also
The Enigma Files, UK / BBC Two, 1980
Cold Squad, CAN / CTV, 1998
Waking the Dead, UK / BBC One, 2000
New Tricks, UK / BBC One, 2003
Cold Case, USA / CBS, 2003
Signal, South Korea / TVN, 2016
Signal, Japan / Fuji TV, 2018

References

External links
 Zettai Reido: Mikaiketsu Jiken Tokumei Sōsa official website
 Zettai Reido: Tokushu Hanzai Sennyū Sōsa official website
 Zettai Reido: Tokushu Hanzai Sennyū Sōsa Staff Blog 
 
 

Japanese crime television series
Japanese drama television series
Japanese police procedural television series
Serial drama television series
Fuji TV dramas
2010 Japanese television series debuts
2018 Japanese television series endings